Kazuya Abe is a Japanese retired mixed martial artist. He competed in the Bantamweight and Featherweight divisions.

Martial arts career
Kazuya Abe made his mixed martial arts debut in 1999, at Shooto: Shooter's Soul. He faced Yohei Nanbu. Abe would come out victorious, winning a unanimous decision.

He won another unanimous decision, when he faced the 0-1 Koji Takeuchi during Shooto: Renaxis 1.

He would suffer his first professional loss during Shooto: Renaxis 3, losing by a majority decision against Takenori Ito.

Looking to bounce back during Shooto: Renaxis 5, he fought the future DEEP featherweight and lightweight champion Dokonjonosuke Mishima, and lost a unanimous decision.

His decision streak would continue when he faced Kazuhiro Inoue. The bout ended in a draw.

He would then earn two stoppage wins, knocking Makoto Ishikawa out in the first round, and securing a first round armbar against Matt Hamilton.

His last fight came against Kentaro Imaizumi during Shooto: Treasure Hunt 10. Abe lost, after his corner threw in the towel during the third minute of the first round. This would be the last time Kazuya Abe has fought.

Mixed martial arts record

|-
| Loss
| align=center| 4-3-1
| Kentaro Imaizumi
| TKO (corner stoppage)
| Shooto: Treasure Hunt 10
| 
| align=center| 1
| align=center| 2:06
| Yokohama, Kanagawa, Japan
| 
|-
| Win
| align=center| 4-2-1
| Matt Hamilton
| Submission (armbar)
| Shooto: Gig East 9
| 
| align=center| 1
| align=center| 3:56
| Tokyo, Japan
| 
|-
| Win
| align=center| 3-2-1
| Makoto Ishikawa
| KO (punch)
| Shooto: To The Top 8
| 
| align=center| 1
| align=center| 0:29
| Tokyo, Japan
| 
|-
| Draw
| align=center| 2-2-1
| Kazuhiro Inoue
| Draw
| Shooto: Gig East 1
| 
| align=center| 2
| align=center| 5:00
| Tokyo, Japan
| 
|-
| Loss
| align=center| 2-2
| Dokonjonosuke Mishima
| Decision (unanimous)
| Shooto: Renaxis 5
| 
| align=center| 2
| align=center| 5:00
| Kadoma, Osaka, Japan
| 
|-
| Loss
| align=center| 2-1
| Takenori Ito
| Decision (majority)
| Shooto: Renaxis 3
| 
| align=center| 2
| align=center| 5:00
| Setagaya, Tokyo, Japan
| 
|-
| Win
| align=center| 2-0
| Koji Takeuchi
| Decision (unanimous)
| Shooto: Renaxis 1
| 
| align=center| 2
| align=center| 5:00
| Tokyo, Japan
| 
|-
| Win
| align=center| 1-0
| Yohei Nanbu
| Decision (unanimous)
| Shooto: Shooter's Soul
| 
| align=center| 2
| align=center| 5:00
| Setagaya, Tokyo, Japan
|

See also
List of male mixed martial artists

References

Japanese male mixed martial artists
Bantamweight mixed martial artists
Featherweight mixed martial artists
Living people
Year of birth missing (living people)